is a passenger railway station in the city of Ōta, Gunma, Japan, operated by the private railway operator Tōbu Railway. It is numbered "TI-47".

Lines

Station layout
The station consists of a single island platform connected to the station building by a footbridge.

Platforms

Adjacent stations

History
Ryūmai Station opened on May 10, 1942. A new station building was completed in 2008.

From March 17, 2012, station numbering was introduced on all Tōbu lines, with Ryūmai Station becoming "TI-47".

Passenger statistics
In fiscal 2019, the station was used by an average of 611 passengers daily (boarding passengers only).

Surrounding area
 Ōta sports complex 
 Ōta-Ryūmai Post Office

References
 Zenkoku Tetsudo Jijo Daikenkyu  
 Ekisha Saihakken  
 Tetsudo Haisen Ato o Aruku

External links

 Tobu station information 
	

Tobu Koizumi Line
Stations of Tobu Railway
Railway stations in Gunma Prefecture
Railway stations in Japan opened in 1942
Ōta, Gunma